William Joseph Patton (April 19, 1922 – January 1, 2011) was an American amateur golfer best known for almost winning the 1954 Masters Tournament.

Patton was born in Morganton, North Carolina. He graduated from Wake Forest University in 1943.

In the 1954 Masters Tournament at Augusta National Golf Club, Patton came within one stroke of being in a three-man playoff with Ben Hogan and Sam Snead. His final round 71 included a hole-in-one on the par-3 6th hole and a double bogey on the par-5 13th hole, when he tried to reach the green in two and put his ball into Rae's Creek.

Patton won several amateur tournaments including the North and South Amateur three times and the Southern Amateur twice. He also won the Carolinas Open twice.

Patton played on five Walker Cup teams; 1955, 1957, 1959, 1963, and 1965 and was captain of the 1969 team. He played on the Eisenhower Trophy team in 1958 and 1962.

Patton was awarded the Bob Jones Award by the United States Golf Association in 1982.

Patton was inducted into several Halls of Fame:
North Carolina Sports Hall of Fame in 1967
Wake Forest University's Sports Hall of Fame in 1974
Southern Golf Association Hall of Fame in 1975
Carolinas Golf Reporters Association Carolinas Golf Hall of Fame in 1981

Tournament wins
1947 Carolinas Amateur
1951 Carolinas Open
1952 Carolinas Open (tied with Bobby Locke)
1954 North and South Amateur
1958 Carolinas Amateur
1961 Southern Amateur, Azalea Invitational, Carolinas Amateur
1962 North and South Amateur
1963 North and South Amateur
1964 North Carolina Amateur
1965 Southern Amateur
1979 Carolinas Senior Amateur
1981 Carolinas Senior Amateur

Results in major championships

LA = low amateur
CUT = missed the half-way cut
"T" indicates a tie for a place
R256, R128, R64, R32, R16, QF, SF = Round in which player lost in match play

Sources: Masters, U.S. Open, U.S. Amateur, British Amateur: 1955, 1959

U.S. national team appearances
Walker Cup: 1955 (winners), 1957 (winners), 1959 (winners), 1963 (winners), 1965 (tied, cup retained), 1969 (non-playing captain, winners)
Eisenhower Trophy: 1958, 1962 (winners)
Americas Cup: 1954 (winners), 1956 (winners), 1958 (winners), 1963 (winners)

References

External links
Seventy Years of Great Golf with Billy Joe
Let's Smile Again - Sports Illustrated, August 23, 1954

American male golfers
Amateur golfers
Wake Forest Demon Deacons men's golfers
Golfers from North Carolina
People from Morganton, North Carolina
1922 births
2011 deaths